Fatman Films, is a music company and film production company of Bangladesh. The company was established in 2011 by musician Adit Ozbert. Fatman Industries is a well known private investor and affiliate. The company specializes in music production, film production and distribution.

Films
Following are the list of notable films produced and distributed by Fatman Films:

Music industry and other
Along with producing films, Fatman Films have also produced some noteworthy music albums including Ontohin, Fatmaz Inc, Porshi III and several other popular albums. Fatman Films were also involved a handful of TV commercials for Grameenphone, Advanced Chemical Industries, and Banglalink.

References

Mass media companies of Bangladesh
Entertainment companies established in 2011